Agua Fria National Monument is in the U.S. state of Arizona, approximately  north of downtown Phoenix, Arizona. Created by Presidential proclamation on January 11, 2000, the  monument is managed by the Bureau of Land Management, an agency within the U.S. Department of the Interior. The Bureau of Land Management already managed the lands; however, under monument status the level of protection and preservation of resources within the new monument have been enhanced.

The monument is a unit of the BLM's National Landscape Conservation System. Over 450 distinct Native American structures have been recorded in the monument, some of large pueblos containing more than 100 rooms each. The enhanced protection status also provides greater habitat protection for the numerous plant and animal communities.

Antiquities

Petroglyphs are scattered across the numerous puebloan ruins, which were built between 1250 and 1450 C.E. when several thousand Native Americans, known as the Perry Mesa Tradition, inhabited the region. The petroglyphs depict animals, geometric figures and abstract symbols and are found by the thousands. Numerous ruins of agricultural terraces and irrigation devices indicate that farming was widespread during this period. Other historical entities that are found include 19th century mining features and Basque sheep camps.

Natural history
More than 140 bird species have been recorded at the monument. 

Notable species of reptiles and amphibians, including the leopard frog, the garter snake, and the desert tortoise, can be seen at the monument. Mammals such as the pronghorn, mule deer, white-tail deer and javelina are relatively common. The elk, black bears and mountain lions are also found in the monument, but are much less common. Native fish including the longfin dace, the Gila mountain sucker, speckled dace, and three endangered native fish including the Gila intermedia, charalito, and desert pupfish exist in the -long Agua Fria River and its tributaries.

In late 2004, the BLM and the Sierra Club helped spark the formation of the Friends of the Agua Fria National Monument, a non-profit organization created to assist the federal agency in monument protection, management, and outreach.

See also
 List of national monuments of the United States

References

External links

 
 BLM.gov: official Agua Fria National Monument website
 Richinbar – Ghost Town of the Month at azghosttowns.com

National Monuments in Arizona
Bureau of Land Management National Monuments
Bureau of Land Management areas in Arizona
Protected areas of Yavapai County, Arizona
2000 establishments in Arizona
Protected areas established in 2000
Units of the National Landscape Conservation System